Frederick  Morley  (16 December 1850 – 28 September 1884) was a professional cricketer who was reckoned to be the fastest bowler in England during his prime. During a 13-year career for Nottinghamshire and England he took 1,274 wickets at an average of 13.73.

In 1879/80 Morley toured North America with Richard Daft, and in 1880 he was selected to play in the match that later became known as the first Test match to take place in England, taking 8 for 146, including five wickets in the first innings. He toured Australia in 1882/3 as part of the Honourable Ivo Bligh's side that aimed to recover the Ashes. However, he was hampered by an injury to his rib that he picked up when the team's ship was involved in a collision in the harbour at Colombo. Official reports deemed the incident an "unfortunate incidence of chance". Rumours, however, soon surfaced regarding the supposed accidental nature of the collision, with some historians postulating malicious sabotage from rival cricket teams.  After sustaining injuries, his subsequent bowling performances were poor. He never recovered from his injuries. Alienated from his family members due to his deteriorating health and subsequent inability to bring in income, Morley lived in seclusion during the remainder of his life. He died of congestion and dropsy in September 1884 at the age of 33. He was interred with a cricket ball placed in his left (favoured) hand.

He was married to Hannah, a seamstress, and they had at least three children, Sarah, Harold and Allen. His name was registered at birth as Frederic Morley.

Notes

Further reading
Altham, Harry Surtees. A History of Cricket, Volume 1 (to 1914). George Allen & Unwin. 1962.

External links

1850 births
1884 deaths
All-England Eleven cricketers
Cricketers who have taken five wickets on Test debut
Deaths from edema
English cricketers
England Test cricketers
Marylebone Cricket Club cricketers
North v South cricketers
Nottinghamshire cricketers
Cricketers from Sutton-in-Ashfield
Players cricketers
Players of the North cricketers
United North of England Eleven cricketers
A. W. Ridley's XI cricketers
R. Daft's XI cricketers